Christine Harris (born 14 January 1956) is a British archer who competed in the 1980 Summer Olympic Games.

Olympics 

Harris competed at the 1980 Summer Olympic Games in the women's individual event and finished 25th with a score of 2187 points.

References

External links 

 Profile on worldarchery.org

1956 births
Living people
British female archers
Olympic archers of Great Britain
Archers at the 1980 Summer Olympics